The 2007–08 Toyota Racing Series was the fourth running of the Toyota Racing Series. The Toyota Racing Series is New Zealand's premier open-wheeler motorsport category. The Series includes races for every major trophy in New Zealand circuit racing including the New Zealand Motor Cup and the Denny Hulme Memorial Trophy. The cars are also the category for the 2008 New Zealand Grand Prix, which was held as the third race of the Manfeild Autocourse round, - one of only two races in the world with FIA approval to use the Grand Prix nomenclature outside Formula One.

Teams and drivers

The following teams and drivers are competing during the 2007–08 Toyota Racing Series.

Calendar

Results

References
toyotaracing.co.nz

Toyota Racing Series
Toyota Racing Series
Toyota Racing Series